Black Humor or Umorismo in nero, is a 1965 black comedy anthology film directed by Claude Autant-Lara, Giancarlo Zagni and José María Forqué.

Cast
Sylvie	... 	La mère Belhomme - segment 1 'La Bestiole" (as Louise Sylvie)
Pierre Brasseur	... 	Le guérisseur - segment 1 'La Bestiole'
Jean Richard	... 	Polyte - segment 1 'La Bestiole'
Pauline Carton	... 	La Rapet - segment 1 'La Bestiole'
Paulette Dubost	... 	segment 1 'La Bestiole'
Robert Arnoux	... 	segment 1 'La Bestiole'
Jacques Marin	... 	segment 1 'La Bestiole'
Jean Martinelli	... 	segment 1 'La Bestiole'
Pierre Repp	... 	segment 1 'La Bestiole'
Emma Penella	... 	Miss Wilma - segment 2 'La Mandrilla - Miss Wilma'
José Luis López Vázquez... 	Jacinto - segment 2 'La Mandrilla - Miss Wilma'
Leo Anchóriz	... 	Gayton - segment 2 'La Mandrilla - Miss Wilma'
 Madame Parlow	... 	segment 2 'La Mandrilla - Miss Wilma'
Agustín González	... 	segment 2 'La Mandrilla - Miss Wilma'
Alicia Hermida	... 	segment 2 'La Mandrilla - Miss Wilma'
 Alida Valli ...  la veuve -	segment 3 'La Cornacchia'
 Folco Lulli ...  le comte Altiero Ripoli -	segment 3 'La Cornacchia' 
 Maria Cuadra ... Maria -	segment 3 'La Cornacchia'

External links
 

1965 films
French black comedy films
1960s Spanish-language films
1960s black comedy films
Italian black comedy films
Films based on works by Guy de Maupassant
Films directed by Claude Autant-Lara
Films directed by Giancarlo Zagni
Spanish black comedy films
1965 comedy-drama films
1960s Italian films
1960s French films